Belomorsky (masculine), Belomorskaya (feminine), or Belomorskoye (neuter) may refer to:
Belomorsky District, a district of the Republic of Karelia, Russia
Belomorskaya, a station of the Zamoskvoretskaya Line of the Moscow Metro, Moscow, Russia
Belomorskoye Urban Settlement, a municipal formation incorporating the town of Belomorsk and eleven rural localities in Belomorsky District of the Republic of Karelia, Russia
Belomorskoye (rural locality), a rural locality (a settlement) in Kaliningrad Oblast, Russia

See also
Belomorsk